Hull Reform Synagogue, also known as Ne've Shalom,  is a Reform Jewish community based in Willerby near Kingston upon Hull  in  the East Riding of Yorkshire, England. A member of the Movement for Reform Judaism, the community was founded in 1966. Services were held in people's homes, at the civic hall in Cottingham and in a Methodist hall. A foundation stone for a new synagogue was laid in November 1991, and the first service at Hull Reform Synagogue was held in February 1992.

Services are held on Friday evenings (Erev Shabbat), on the first Saturday (Shabbat) of each month, and also on Festivals and High Holy Days.

See also
 History of the Jews in Hull
List of Jewish communities in the United Kingdom
 List of former synagogues in the United Kingdom
 Movement for Reform Judaism

References

External links 
 Official website

1966 establishments in England
1992 establishments in England
Buildings and structures in Kingston upon Hull
Reform synagogues in the United Kingdom
Jewish organizations established in 1966
Synagogues completed in 1992
Synagogues in England